Auckland Campbell Geddes, 1st Baron Geddes,  (21 June 1879 – 8 June 1954) was a British academic, soldier, politician and diplomat. He was a member of David Lloyd George's coalition government during the First World War and also served as Ambassador to the United States.

Early life
Geddes was born in London the son of Auckland Campbell-Geddes, a civil engineer, and his wife Christina Helen MacLeod Anderson. He was the brother of Sir Eric Campbell-Geddes, First Lord of the Admiralty during World War I and principal architect of the Geddes Axe, which led to the retrenchment of British public expenditure following the War. His sister was Dr. Mona Chalmers Watson, the first woman to graduate M.D. from the University of Edinburgh and the first Chief Controller of the Women's Army Auxiliary Corps.

Career

Boer War
Geddes served in the Second Boer War in South Africa between 1901 and 1902 as a second lieutenant in the Highland Light Infantry. On 2 June 1902 he was promoted a lieutenant in the 3rd (Militia) battalion of the regiment, and he returned home with other men of this battalion on the SS Doune Castle in September 1902, after the war had ended two months earlier.

Academic career
Geddes was educated at George Watson's College, in Edinburgh. He then studied Medicine at Edinburgh University graduating MB ChB in 1903. From 1906 to 1909, Geddes was an Assistant Professor of Anatomy at Edinburgh University. The university gave him his doctorate (MD) in 1908.

In 1909 he was elected a Fellow of the Royal Society of Edinburgh. his proposers were William Turner (anatomist), Sir Edward Albert Sharpey-Schafer, David Waterston and George Chrystal. From 1913 to 1914 he was a Professor of Anatomy at the Royal College of Surgeons in Ireland. From 1913 to 1914, he was a Professor of Anatomy at McGill University. His academic career was interrupted by the First World War during which he served as a Brigadier General in the War Office.

First World War
During the First World War he served as a Major in the 17th Northumberland Fusiliers and was on the staff of the General Headquarters in France as a Brevet Lieutenant-Colonel and Honorary Brigadier General. Geddes was Director of Recruiting at the War Office from 1916 to 1917.

Political and diplomatic career
In 1917 he was elected Unionist Member of Parliament for Basingstoke, a seat he held until 1920. He was sworn of the Privy Council in 1917 and served under David Lloyd George as Director of National Service from 1917 to 1918, as President of the Local Government Board from 1918 to 1919, as Minister of Reconstruction in 1919 and as President of the Board of Trade (with a seat in the cabinet) from 1919 to 1920.

Geddes was appointed Principal of McGill University in 1919 but never undertook his official duties. He resigned in 1920 when he was appointed British Ambassador to the United States which he served until 1924. As His Majesty's ambassador, Geddes investigated the treatment of British immigrants at Ellis Island, for which he wrote a report (1923). He was also heavily involved in the negotiations that led up to the Washington Naval Treaty of 1922, which limited the size and number of the world's battleships. He was appointed Knight Grand Cross of the Order of St. Michael and St. George (G.C.M.G.) in 1922.

From 1924 to 1947, he was the Chairman of the Rio Tinto Company and Rhokana Corporation. He returned to public service during the Second World War when he served as Commissioner for Civil Defence for the South-East Region from 1939 to 1944 and for the North-West Region from 1941 to 1942. The latter year he was raised to the peerage as Baron Geddes, of Rolvenden in the County of Kent.

Personal life
On 8 September 1906, Geddes was married to Isabella Gamble Ross at St. Mary's Church in Livingston, Staten Island. Isabella was a daughter of William Adolphus Ross of Staten Island, New York. Together, they had five children:

 Ross Campbell Geddes, 2nd Baron Geddes (1907–1975), who married Enid Mary Butler, only child of Clarence Henry Butler, of Tenterden.
 Lieutenant-Colonel the Hon. Alexander Campbell Geddes (1910–1972), who married Margaret Kathleen Addis (1908-1992), daughter of Sir Charles Stewart Addis. They divorced in 1964 and he married, secondly, Marie-Anne Helene Emanuela Altgräfin zu Salm-Reifferscheidt-Krautheim und Dyck (1933–2015), daughter of Franz Josef Fürst zu Salm-Reifferscheidt-Krautheim und Dyck and Cäcilie Prinzessin zu Salm-Salm, on 27 July 1964.
 Hon. Margaret Campbell Geddes (1913–1997), who married Prince Louis of Hesse and by Rhine, last surviving member of this family.
 Hon. John Reay Campbell Geddes (1915–1978), who married Diana Elizabeth Swift, a daughter of Brig. Charles Copley Swift.
 Hon. David Campbell Geddes (1917–1995), who married Gerda Bruun, daughter of Norwegian Minister of Trade Gerdt Meyer Bruun, in 1948.

Lord Geddes died in January 1954, aged 74, and was succeeded in the barony by his eldest son, Ross. Lady Geddes died in January 1962.

Arms

References

External links

 
 The Papers of Sir Auckland Campbell Geddes held at Churchill Archives Centre
 

Academics of the University of Edinburgh
British anatomists
Ambassadors of the United Kingdom to the United States
British Army personnel of the Second Boer War
British Army personnel of World War I
Conservative Party (UK) MPs for English constituencies
Diplomatic peers
Highland Light Infantry officers
Knights Grand Cross of the Order of St Michael and St George
Knights Commander of the Order of the Bath
Members of the Privy Council of the United Kingdom
Academic staff of McGill University
Principals of McGill University
Royal Northumberland Fusiliers officers
UK MPs 1910–1918
UK MPs 1918–1922
UK MPs who were granted peerages
1879 births
1954 deaths
People educated at George Watson's College
Alumni of the University of Edinburgh
Presidents of the Board of Trade
Barons created by George VI